Julian Löschner (born 31 August 1996) is a German footballer who plays as a right-back for Schwaben Augsburg.

Career
Löschner made his professional debut for Rot-Weiß Erfurt in the 3. Liga on 17 October 2015, starting in the home match against Fortuna Köln, which finished as a 0–2 loss.

References

External links
 Profile at DFB.de
 

1996 births
Footballers from Nuremberg
Living people
German footballers
Association football fullbacks
FC Rot-Weiß Erfurt players
1. FC Schweinfurt 05 players
1. FC Kaiserslautern II players
TSV Schwaben Augsburg players
3. Liga players
Regionalliga players
Oberliga (football) players
Bayernliga players